Arturs Šingirejs (born 10 April 1984 in Saldus), better known as Dons, is a Latvian singer and songwriter. He is one of the most popular singers in Latvia, having won the Latvian Music Recording Awards' Top Radio Hit award seven times for most played song.

He has released eight solo albums and has won numerous awards including Latvijas Radio's Muzikālās Banka Song of the Year four times. He has attempted to represent Latvia in the Eurovision Song Contest twice with the songs "Freedom is my Religion" (2010) and "Pēdējā Vēstule" (2014), finishing in second both times. He has used the stage names Art Green and Art Singer while performing outside of Latvia.

Born in Saldus, Latvia, Dons began his career winning the Latvian reality show Talantu Fabrikā in 2003. He released a duet album, Viens Otram (2004), with fellow contestant Lily (real name Linda Kalniņa, m. 2009; div. 2013). His first solo album Lights On (2006) would be mostly in English. He would find success releasing his next seven albums in the Latvian language: Lelle (2008), Signāls (2013), Varanasi (2014), Sibīrija (2015), Tepat (2016), Namiņš. Kaste. Vārdi (2018), and Tūrists (2020). At the Latvian Music Recording Awards, he has won Best Pop Album twice from five nominations for Varanasi (2014) and Tūrists (2020). He has won Best Rock Album once from two nominations with Lelle (2008) and has been nominated once for Best Pop-Rock Album with Signāls (2013).

Early life
Arturs Šingirejs was born on 10 April 1984 in Saldus, Latvia to a Belarusian father and a Latvian mother, who performed professionally as a soloist in the Liepāja group Santa (their leader was Zigmars Liepiņš). He has one brother and three sisters, one of whom was the first to encourage him to perform on stage at the age of four. His mother taught him English from the age of 6 and he credits Freddie Mercury as one of his first musical idols. He studied piano at the Saldus Music School. He had his first solo performance at age 16 and stated, "My first performance was at school, and I realized that I wanted to do this - there is something here that binds me". He would later study culinary arts before returning to music as a profession. He learned to play the guitar and sing through self-study.

Career

2003–2007: Early work
Dons gained popularity in 2003 by winning the Latvian reality show Talantu Fabrikā. During the show, he met and dated fellow contestant Lily (real name Linda Kalniņa) and they would release an English language duet album in 2004, Viens Otram. The album would become a best seller in Latvia and they earned a nomination for Top Radio Hit with "Just For You" at the 2003 Latvian Music Recording Awards. In 2004, his song "Ja es būtu vējš" was nominated for Top Radio Hit at the Latvian Music Recording Awards. After the success of the duet album, Dons would focus on a solo career, releasing his first solo album (mostly in English) Lights On in 2006. The album was nominated for best Rock album and his single, "Lights Out" was nominated for best Rock song at the 2006 Latvian Music Recording Awards.

Afterwards, he moved between London and Los Angeles with Lily, saying in interviews at the time that she was his muse and source of inspiration; they married in 2009. While living aboard, he adopted and subsequently abandoned different stage names; first he used Art Green and later went by Art Singer while in the United States. Dons later commented on his numerous names, "Call me whatever you want. I have a lot of names. The name Art Singer I use in England is an abbreviated name. Art Green was the predecessor of Art Singer, but I somehow didn't feel that name... In Latvia I'm known more as Dons, which I chose myself. That nickname came in and dragged me along and I get along with it well". While in Los Angeles, he received four offers to be the lead singer in various rock bands.

In 2007, he performed in Zigmars Liepiņš' popular musical theatre Adata with the song "Ja Tu Man Esi" (""). The song would be nominated for Top Radio Hit at the Latvian Music Recording Awards that year.

2008–2014: Return to Latvia, Eurovision

In 2008, Dons released his second solo album, Lelle, which was his first Latvian language album. The album would be the first of many where he would collaborate with lyricist Ingus Bērziņš. It would win the Best Rock Album in the Latvian Music Recording Awards that year. The success of the album proved his audience preferred his music performed in Latvian over his English language music. He represented Latvia at the New Wave 2008, where he got 4th place.

In 2009, Dons participated in the television series 1000 Jūdzes Indijā presented by Latvijas Televīzija with fellow travelers radio DJ Egon Reiter, comedian Jānis Skutelis, Edgars Zaķis and rapper Gustavo. After the series ended, he stayed in India for a month longer as a creative means of self-searching and meditation, which later reflected in his music. Still living abroad, he briefly returned to Latvia for a month to compete in the 2010 Latvian Eurovision Song Contest, finishing in second with his song "Freedom is my Religion".

Other than sharing the songs he wrote, Dons has remained private about his activities while living abroad. In 2012, Dons returned again to Latvia, for a longer period to revive his career with a new album with songs written while in London. Writing the album's music, he worked with song lyricist Ingus Bērziņš to produce his third solo album, Signāls. He would win Best Radio Hit at the 2012 and 2013 Latvian Music Recording Awards for his single "Signāls", which would also win song of the year at Latvijas Radio's 2012 Muzikālās Banka. The album was nominated for Best Pop and Rock Album at the 2013 Latvian Music Recording Awards and his video for "Darling, Darling" was nominated for Best Video.

Outside of producing and touring his album that year, he worked as a voice actor and reality show judge. He voiced and sang as the character of Olaf in the Latvian adaptation of Disney's Frozen (2013). He returned to his origins on the Latvian reality show Jaunā Talantu Fabrikā as a judge, where he tutored winner Aminata Savadogo and later helped produce her songs.

During this period, his marriage with his wife and muse Lily would dissolve and officially end in 2013. His divorce would become the inspiration for his first single "Pēdējā Vēstule" ("") off his next studio album, Varanasi (2014). He considers the album a continuation of his previous album Signāls, stating, "On a sensory level, the album Varanasi is full of relationships, everyday life and cognition. Musically from choir and strings to electronics and rock. I'm happy for the producers' courage not to be afraid to experiment with innovative things".

In 2014, he participated in Dziesma with "Pēdējā Vēstule" in an attempt to represent Latvia in the Eurovision Song Contest". While the song in Latvian is dedicated to his ex-wife, he stated if he had won, he would have sung a version he wrote himself in English and re-dedicate that version to his father who passed away in 2007. However, he finished in second place behind Aarzemnieki losing by 97 votes, much to the surprise of many. Despite the loss at the Dziema 2014, the song would win Song of the Year at both the 2013 Muzikālās Banka (Musical Bank) and the Latvian Music Recording Awards. Due to his popularity, his tour for the album had to be extended, including going from one show at Palladium Riga to six sold out nights. The album reached gold status in Latvia in less than two months after being released. He would have major success at the 2014 Latvian Music Recording Awards, with Varanasi winning Pop Album of the Year and winning Song of the Year with his single "Tev Piedzims Bērns" and Top Radio Hit with "Pāriet Bailes", which would also win Song of the Year at the 2014 Muzikālās Banka awards.

Inspired by the success of Varanasi, Dons embarked on a  journey via the Trans-Siberian Railway from Moscow to Vladivostok, Siberia, and later flying to Delhi, India, and traveling by train to Varanasi in 2014. About his motivation, Dons said, "Although in the song ('Pēdējā Vēstule'), Varanasi is a metaphor for peace of mind, which we can also find in the beet fields, on the stage, at the wheel of a car - wherever there is a place. I know that in any case, getting to this city will be emotional". Traveling alone, he brought only the necessities and his guitar in a creative search for materials for his next album.

2015–2020: Rise in popularity

With his material from his Trans-Siberian Railway journey, Dons released his fifth solo album Sibīrija in 2015 with lyrics again by Ignus Bērziņš. The first single "Medus Pods" was written while stationed near Lake Baikal during his Siberian trip. Dons noted about his ongoing songwriting relationship with the lyricist Bērziņš: "My songs are about myself, my pain and my joys, my dreams and my disappointments, otherwise I can't write. This is exactly the case with 'Medus Pods'. After music and our conversations, Ingus can read the state of my soul very well..." His next two singles from Sibīrija would be "Pašā Ielas Galā" and "Dieviņš". "Medus Pods" would be nominated for Best Song and Best Video at the 2014 Latvian Music Recording Awards. Sibīrija would be nominated for Best Album, "Pašā Ielas Galā" would win Best Video and "Dieviņš" would win Top Radio Hit and be nominated for Alfa's Song of the Year at the 2015 Latvian Music Recording Awards.

In 2015, he was a judge in the first season of the Latvian television show Supernova, which is used to select artists to represent Latvia in future Eurovision Song Contests. He would reprise the same role at the Latvia in the Eurovision Song Contest 2017.

Dons released his sixth solo album Tepat in October 2016 which was the first album where he wrote the lyrics along with the music. The album was stylistically different than his previous albums, featuring a simpler instrumentation but "emotionally richer". The tour featured two nights at Latvia's Arēna Rīga, making Dons one of the few domestic groups capable of bringing in a crowd large enough for that arena. The single "Tepat" would be nominated for Alfa's Song of the Year and Top Radio Hits at the 2017 Latvian Music Recording Awards.

In 2017, he performed with the Riga Dome Choir School on the song "Zelta Kamanas".

In February 2018, Dons released his seventh solo album, Namiņš. Kaste. Vārdi. He featured a variety of lyricists from himself, Ingus Bērziņš, Arnis Račinskis, Ģirts Rozentāls and Kaspars Ansons. The album featured some songs that were originally written in 2010 while in London. The fourth single from the album would be "Salauzta Sirds", which was a collaboration with Ozols. That single would win Top Radio Hit and Best Song at the 2019 Latvian Music Recording awards and the album would be nominated for Best Pop Album.

In 2018, he played the lead role in the 30th anniversary production of the rock opera, Lāčplēsis, based on the Latvian national epic of the same name. Some people doubted his abilities to perform in the lead role, however, Igo who performed as lead in the original production noted after hearing his performance, "Dons has a very wide range of voices, he timbres his tone very masterfully. I have never had any doubts about him, because purely technically he is capable of very, very much. Probably even more than people know and can imagine. Therefore, I had no doubts and no question as to whether he could cope with this task."

In 2020, he participated in a number of collaborations. He worked with 20 Latvian musicians to create the charity anthem, "Es zinu, Tu esi" to raise money for domestic violence victims. He released another song "Mans Eņģelis" for the charity Angels over Latvia, which raised money to benefit children in need of medical care. For Aminata Savadogo's song "Nejauc man prātu", Dons helped with the music and lyrics. In response to the Latvian government lack of support for the cultural sector during the COVID-19 pandemic in Latvia, Dons and other leading Latvian musicians expressed their criticism with a video composition called "Klusums".

On 24 November 2020, Dons would release his eighth solo album, Tūrists, which featured 10 songs from a total of 27 he had written. The lead single "Es Nāktu Mājās" would be become popular, winning Song of the Year at the 2019 Muzikālās Banka and tying him for most ever with Prāta Vētra (Brainstorm). At the 2020 Latvian Music Recording Awards, it would be nominated for Best Song and Song of the Year and winning Best Video. His single "Tūrists" ("") was nominated for most valuable song during the 2020 Muzikālās Banka. The album would win Best Pop Album at the 2021 Latvian Music Recording Awards.

2021–present: Signing with Universal Music

In March 2021, Dons participated in an open letter to the government that was signed by leading Latvian musicians, artists, writers and other creatives. In it, they criticized the government's ongoing lack of support for copyright and compensation laws for their works when it came to data carriers. A few days later, he released the single "Piedošana", in which he teamed up with Intars Busulis and Prāta Vētra (Brainstorm) to perform it. The song was created prior to the COVID-19 pandemic in Latvia. Dons summarized the song as, "Forgiveness is an art we learn all our lives. Sometimes it seems like we've learned it, but new challenges come and we have to start all over again". On 18 April 2021, he performed as a guest singer on Balss Maskā as the Evening Star, singing "The Best" by Bonnie Tyler.

In August 2021, Dons announced he had signed with Universal Music. His first single with the new label was released on 16 September 2021 titled "Tas rakstīts debesīs (Piena ceļš)". The song was cowritten with DJ Rudd (Rūdolfs Budze) and Aminata Savadogo about an admiration "of space, of infinity, of stars, about possibilities and probabilities". It was nominated for three 2022 Latvian Music Recording Awards for Top Radio Hit, song of the year and ELVI song of the year and along with "Piedošana", his collaboration with Prata Vetra and Intars Busulis, made the final 15 for most valuable song of the 2021 Muzikālā Banka. "Tas rakstīts debesīs (Piena ceļš)" finished in third place and "Piedošana" finished in seventh place during the 2021 Muzikālā Banka finals.

In February 2022, Dons released a new single, "Tavs pieskāriens". He also announced a summer concert at the ruins of the Sigulda Castle and an upcoming album to be released summer 2022. In May 2022, Dons collaborated with Latvian rapper rolands če on his next single, "Brīnišķīga diena". At the 2022 Muzikālā Banka finals, "Tavs pieskāriens" finished in 7th place. At the 2023 Latvian Music Recording Awards known as the Zelta Mikrofons, his single "Tavs pieskāriens" was nominated for song of the year, video of the year, top radio hit and people's choice for (ELVI) song of the year. His duet "Brīnišķīga diena" with rolands če was also nominated for top radio hit. "Tavs pieskāriens" won song of the year and Top Radio Hit.

Music style

Dons is a long-time collaborator with lyricist Ingus Bērziņš, who he considers one of the best poets in Latvia. Bērziņš' lyrics are sometimes criticized as making little sense: Normunds Vucāns of ParMuziku (an online magazine produced by Latvian Music Producers Association) writes, "Unfortunately, these thoughts are hidden behind such unsuccessful and illogical lyrics that the idea is absolutely not understood, and the question arises as to whether the author himself understands what he has created." However, Dons says he knows the meaning of all the lyrics, appreciating that Bērziņš is adventurous with his writings. In his later albums, Don began to write his own words instead of relying on Bērziņš, saying, "Recently, however, our cooperation has been less frequent, because I have started writing lyrics myself. In the past, maybe I didn't have anything to say or I couldn't say it, but now I have something to say. But now and then I send him my texts to read". Dons has worked with other lyricists though and has no issues singing others' lyrics as long as they fit his melodies.

Due to the popularity of some of his songs, he stated how he had to distance the personal origins of those songs from the listeners so that the music can "belong" to them, saying:

"I have a song ("Kolekcionārs" , lyrics by Ingus Bērziņš based on John Fowles' The Collector) on the album Lelle with a message written about tragic events. I remember once telling the true story at a concert and there was a terrible silence in the audience. Of course, later the audience came back to life, but in this little moment of silence, I saw that the audience is in tears, because the story of the song is really heavy. After this incident, I decided - no, with my private stories about songs, at least in concerts, it is better to slow down.

So I say that everyone has the right to their own version and I have no right to interfere in this interpretation... Other times it's cool to leave listeners with a subtext to the lyrics. And response, the listeners unravel exactly what I had in the song! Other times you will find out something like you had never looked at this song. Even an example with the same song "Kolekcionārs"  - it can be like a ballad of love. It can too! I didn't see it that way, I saw a very gloomy scene, but people see something like that there. Not bad! I'm interested in new interpretations".

Dons says about his music that the "thought is always the same - a story about emotions and feelings, a story about love and experience." He is known for playing only a few large shows for each tour, as he prefers that "each song has its own story, including my own. And the story is an experience. Maybe that's why I don't perform so often". He has performed in Latvia's largest arenas including the Palladium Riga, Arena Riga and the Daugava National Stadium. He lives in "two cycles - concerts or album recording" and when he is recording an album, he cannot perform live and vice versa.

Personal life
When asked if there's a difference between his stage personality and his private self, Dons said, "Not at all, Dons is maybe louder than Arturs. Arturs is quieter and calmer. I'd say they're twin brothers. Arturs is lazier than Dons, that's the only difference. When there's work to be done, Dons will always drive Arturs to work". Dons is avid about fitness, exercise and being an yoga practitioner. He is a fan of the National Basketball Association. He often travels around the world, having lived in London and the United States. Dons was married to Lily (real name Linda Kalniņa), whom he met while as a contestant on the Latvian reality show Talantu Fabrikā. The two were married from 2009 until 2013. He is currently in a relationship with Madara Mālmane. He owns the Engure Café with Kaspars Roga, who is the drummer of Prāta Vētra (Brainstorm).

Discography

Albums

Filmography

Concert tour videos

Film/television

Theater

Awards
The Annual Latvian Music Recording Awards (equivalent to the Grammy awards) presents the Zelta Mikrofons awards to the best music recordings of all genres from the previous year, which are evaluated by a professional jury. In 2016, due to the decision of Latvian Music Producers Association members, the title of the award was changed to the year in which the relevant ceremony is held therefore no awards were listed using this year. The Top Radio Hits award is given to the song that has received most annual airplay and reflects the most popular song that year: Dons has won this award a total of seven times from 16 nominations. He has won Best Pop Album twice from five nominations for Varanasi (2014) and Tūrists (2020). He has won Best Rock Album once from two nominations with Lelle (2008) and has been nominated once for Best Pop-Rock Album.

Latvijas Radio presents the annual Muzikālās Banka award to the most valuable pop and rock song, which is selected based on audience votes and evaluation by a professional jury. Dons has won this award a total of four times, tying him for most with Prāta Vētra (Brainstorm).

|-
! 2003
| "Just For You"
| Top Radio Hit
| Latvian Music Recording Awards
| 
| duet as Dons & Lily
| 
|-
! 2004
| "Ja es būtu vējš"
| Top Radio Hit
| Latvian Music Recording Awards
| 
| 
| 
|-
! rowspan="2" | 2006
| Lights On
| Best Rock Album
| rowspan="2" | Latvian Music Recording Awards
| 
| 
| rowspan="2" |  
|-
| "Lights Out"
| Best Rock Song
| 
|
|-
! rowspan="2" | 2007
| "Tukšums"
| Best Rock Song
| rowspan="2" | Latvian Music Recording Awards
| 
| 
| rowspan="2" | 
|-
| "Ja Tu Man Esi"
| Top Radio Hit
| 
|
|-
! rowspan="1" | 2008
| Lelle
| Best Rock Album
| Latvian Music Recording Awards
| 
| 
| 
|-
! rowspan="2" | 2012
| rowspan="2" | "Signāls"
| Top Radio Hit
| Latvian Music Recording Awards 
| 
|
| 
|-
| Song of the Year
| Muzikālās Banka
| 
| 
| 
|-
! rowspan="7" | 2013
| Signāls
| Best Pop-Rock Album
| rowspan="6" | Latvian Music Recording Awards 
| 
|
| rowspan="6" | 
|-
| "Darling, Darling"
| Video of the Year
| 
| 
|-
| "Signāls"
| rowspan="2" | Top Radio Hit
| 
| 
|-
| "Māsa upe"
| 
| 
|-
| rowspan="3" | "Pēdējā Vēstule"
| Best Song
| 
| 
|-
| Alfa's Song of the Year 
| 
| 
|-
| Song of the Year
| Muzikālās Banka
| 
| 
| 
|-
! rowspan="9" | 2014
| rowspan="2" | Varanasi
| Best Pop Album
| rowspan="8" | Latvian Music Recording Awards 
| 
| 
| rowspan="8" | 
|-
| Best Concert Video
| 
| 
|-
| "Medus Pods"
| rowspan="2" | Best Video
| 
| 
|-
| rowspan="2" | "Tev Piedzims Bērns"
| 
| 
|-
| rowspan="2" | Song of the Year
| 
| 
|-
| "Medus Pods"
| 
| 
|-
| rowspan="3" | "Pāriet Bailes"
| Top Radio Hit
| 
| 
|-
| Alfa's Song of the Year
| 
| 
|-
| Song of the Year
| Muzikālās Banka 
| 
| 
| 
|-
! rowspan="7" | 2015
| Sibīrija 
| Best Pop Album
| rowspan="7" | Latvian Music Recording Awards 
| 
| 
| rowspan="7" | 
|-
| rowspan="2" | "Dieviņš"
| Alfa's Song of the Year
| 
| 
|-
| rowspan="2" | Top Radio Hit
| 
| 
|-
| rowspan="2" | "Pašā Ielas Galā"
| 
| 
|-
| Best Video
| 
| 
|-
| "Pašā Ielas Galā"
| rowspan="2" | Best Song
| 
| 
|-
| "Dieviņš"
| 
| 
|-
! rowspan="5" | 2017
| rowspan="2" | "Tepat"
| Alfa's Song of the Year
| rowspan="5" | Latvian Music Recording Awards 
| 
|
| rowspan="5" |
|-
| rowspan="2" |Top Radio Hit
|
|
|-
| "Pastnieks"
| 
|
|-
| Tepat
| Best Pop Album
| 
|
|-
| Tepat
| Best Album Art
| 
|
|-
! rowspan="4" | 2018
| rowspan="3" | "Pa ceļam"
| Top Radio Hit
| rowspan="4" | Latvian Music Recording Awards 
| 
|
| rowspan="4" |
|-
|Alfa's Song of the Year
|
|
|-
|Best Song 
|
|
|-
| Tepat
| Best Concert Video
| 
| 
|-
! rowspan="5" | 2019
| rowspan="3" | "Salauzta Sirds" (featuring Ozols)
| Top Radio Hit
| rowspan="4" | Latvian Music Recording Awards 
| 
|
| rowspan="4" |
|-
|Song of the Year
|
|
|-
|Best Song 
|
|
|-
| Namiņš. Kaste. Vārdi
| Best Pop Album
| 
| 
|-
|"Es Nāktu Mājās"
| Song of the Year
| Muzikālās Banka 
| 
| 
| 
|-
! rowspan="4" | 2020
| rowspan="3" | "Es Nāktu Mājās"
| Best Video
| rowspan="3" | Latvian Music Recording Awards 
| 
|
| rowspan="3" |
|-
|Song of the Year
|
|
|-
|Best Song 
|
|
|-
|"Tūrists"
| Song of the Year
| Muzikālās Banka 
| 
| 
| 
|-
! rowspan="5" | 2021
| Tūrists
| Best Pop Album
| rowspan="3" | Latvian Music Recording Awards 
| 
| 
| rowspan="3" |
|-
| "Tūrists"
| Elektrum Song of the Year
| 
| 
|-
| "Ilgoties man nesanāk"
| Top Radio Hit
| 
| 
|-
|"Tas rakstīts debesīs (Piena ceļš)"
|  rowspan="2" | Song of the Year
|  rowspan="2" | Muzikālās Banka 
| 
| 
|  rowspan="2" | 
|-
|"Piedošana"
| 
| Collaboration with Intars Busulis and Prāta Vētra
|-
! rowspan="4" | 2022
| rowspan="3" | "Tas rakstīts debesīs (Piena ceļš)"
| Song of the Year
| rowspan="3" | Latvian Music Recording Awards 
| 
| rowspan="3" | 
| rowspan="3" | 
|-
| ELVI Song of the Year
| 
|-
| Top Radio Hit
| 
|-
|"Tavs pieskāriens"
| Song of the Year
| Muzikālās Banka 
| 
| 
| 
|-
! rowspan="5" | 2023
| rowspan="4" | "Tavs pieskāriens"
| Song of the Year
| rowspan="5" | Latvian Music Recording Awards 
| 
| rowspan="4" | 
| rowspan="5" | 
|-
| ELVI Song of the Year
| 
|-
| Best Video
| 
|-
| Top Radio Hit
| 
|-
|"Brīnišķīga diena"
| Top Radio Hit
| 
| Collaboration with rolands če
|-

References

External links

21st-century Latvian male singers
1984 births
English-language singers from Latvia
Latvian record producers
Latvian people of Belarusian descent
Latvian pop singers
Latvian songwriters
Living people
People from Saldus